Marie Zeigler was the second-youngest player on the Grand Rapids Chicks of the All-American Girls Professional Baseball League in 1953. She batted right and threw right, was born July 3, 1937 in Belding, Michigan and died November 28, 2014. She was elected to the National Women's Baseball Hall of Fame. The movie A League of Their Own is based on her team.

References

External sources 

 Image of the 1953 team including Zeigler

1937 births
2014 deaths
People from Belding, Michigan